Nkọrọọ is an Ijaw language spoken by about 4,500 ethnic Nkọrọọ in Rivers State, Nigeria.

Nkọrọọ has significantly influenced the Defaka language.

References

External links 
 ELAR archive of Documentation of Nkoroo

Indigenous languages of Rivers State
Ijoid languages